Rio Linda (Spanish: Río Linda, meaning "Pretty River") is a census-designated place (CDP) in Sacramento County, California. It is part of the Sacramento metropolitan area. As of the 2010 census, the CDP population was 15,106, up from 10,466 at the time of the 2000 census.

History

The Rio Linda/Elverta community is located on part of the Rancho Del Paso Mexican land grant of 1844. In 1910, a Fruit Land Company of Minneapolis acquired  of the Grant and in 1912 the area was subdivided. Renamed Rio Linda in 1913, it was known as 'Dry Creek Station', a flag stop for the Northern Electric Railroad, renamed the Sacramento Northern Railway after joining the San Francisco–Sacramento system to improve service the Sacramento Valley. Two families settled in Rio Linda by 1912, three more arrived in 1913, and nine more in 1914. By 1918, approximately fifty families in the community, mostly of Scandinavian and German descent. By 1920, poultry farming had proved to be feasible in the area which was advertised throughout several Eastern states during the 1920s. The Sacramento Northern Railway stopped commuter services in 1940 redirecting focus to freight in the wake of World War II. An association was formed between Rio Linda and Elverta in 1942 as the area became more well known for its excellent poultry production. Steady growth throughout the second half of the 1900s aided by its proximity to the Sacramento metropolitan area and an urban exodus known as white flight from the early-1950s to the mid-1960s.

Geography
Rio Linda is located at  (38.690252, -121.453814). The soil type of the area consists primarily of hard pan made up of silted clay and fine sands.

Nature and Wildlife
 There is a seed library in Rio Linda. A seed library is a collection of seeds that are available free of charge to all members of the community. Seed-savers are asked to bring some of theirs to these locations' Seed Libraries. With enough heirloom seed donations from the region, there will ultimately be a seed library containing plants ideally suited for Sacramento weather.
 Gibson Ranch Park which is near Rio Linda, hosts 325 acres of natural countryside.

Demographics

2010
The 2010 United States Census reported that Rio Linda had a population of 15,106. The racial makeup of Rio Linda was 11,654 (77.1%) White, 621 (4.1%) African American, 235 (1.6%) Native American, 665 (4.4%) Asian, 62 (0.4%) Pacific Islander, 1,304 (8.6%) from other races, and 821 (5.4%) from two or more races. Hispanic or Latino of any race were 3,033 persons (20.1%).

The Census reported that 15,053 people (99.6% of the population) lived in households, 53 (0.4%) lived in non-institutionalized group quarters, and 0 (0%) were institutionalized.

There were 4,792 households, out of which 1,944 (40.6%) had children under the age of 18 living in them, 2,532 (52.8%) were opposite-sex married couples living together, 753 (15.7%) had a female householder with no husband present, 345 (7.2%) had a male householder with no wife present. There were 343 (7.2%) unmarried opposite-sex partnerships, and 42 (0.9%) same-sex married couples or partnerships. 843 households (17.6%) were made up of individuals, and 302 (6.3%) had someone living alone who was 65 years of age or older. The average household size was 3.14. There were 3,630 families (75.8% of all households); the average family size was 3.50.

The population was spread out, with 4,087 people (27.1%) under the age of 18, 1,434 people (9.5%) aged 18 to 24, 3,769 people (25.0%) aged 25 to 44, 4,251 people (28.1%) aged 45 to 64, and 1,565 people (10.4%) who were 65 years of age or older. The median age was 35.9 years. For every 100 females, there were 101.0 males. For every 100 females age 18 and over, there were 98.5 males.

The homeowner vacancy rate was 2.8%; the rental vacancy rate was 4.3%. 10,516 people (69.6% of the population) lived in owner-occupied housing units and 4,537 people (30.0%) lived in rental housing units.

2000
As of the census of 2000, there were 10,466 people, 3,461 households, and 2,647 families residing in the CDP. The racial makeup of the CDP was 83.04% White, 2.23% African American, 1.46% Native American, 2.69% Asian, 0.48% Pacific Islander, 4.88% from other races, and 5.22% from two or more races. Hispanic or Latino of any race were 11.10% of the population.

There were 3,461 households, out of which 38.8% had children under the age of 18 living with them, 54.1% were married couples living together, 15.1% had a female householder with no husband present, and 23.5% were non-families. 17.8% of all households were made up of individuals, and 6.6% had someone living alone who was 65 years of age or older. The average household size was 3.01 and the average family size was 3.35.

In the CDP, the population was spread out, with 30.8% under the age of 18, 8.0% from 18 to 24, 30.2% from 25 to 44, 21.7% from 45 to 64, and 9.3% who were 65 years of age or older. The median age was 34 years. For every 100 females, there were 98.7 males. For every 100 females age 18 and over, there were 95.6 males.

The median income for a household in the CDP was $44,026, and the median income for a family was $45,272. Males had a median income of $38,178 versus $29,504 for females. The per capita income for the CDP was $17,656. About 9.9% of families and 14.1% of the population were below the poverty line, including 20.6% of those under age 18 and 10.3% of those age 65 or over.

Politics

Conservative radio host and former Sacramento resident Rush Limbaugh frequently mentioned Rio Linda, both on The Rush Limbaugh Show and in print.

Recreation and Events 

 Rio Linda is home to the Roy Hayer Memorial Racetrack. This track is noted as the first track that four-time NASCAR champion Jeff Gordon ever competed on.

 Rio Linda hosts the northern terminus of the Sacramento Northern Bike Trail. It is a 10-mile-long paved pathway that connects the Rio Linda area with Downtown Sacramento. The trail was constructed along the abandoned railroad right-of-way which has since served as a commuter connection for cyclists and pedestrians alike.
 There is a dog park, children's playground, picnic area, walking trails and horse stables within Gibson Ranch Park which is near Rio Linda.
 Depot Park in Rio Linda has a community center with a commercial kitchen, a playground, horseshoe pits, a basketball court, a tennis court, shuffleboard, a parking lot, picnic areas and trail access to the Sacramento Northern Bike Trail.
 Rio Linda Elverta Recreation and Park District is located at 810 Oak Lane. It is a rec center that offers aquatics, adult activities, youth activities and other classes to the local community.
 Rio Linda hosts a privately owned airport known as the Rio Linda Airport.
 Rio Linda has an event known as Farm and Tractor Days, which is hosted at the Dry Creek Ranch House. Its 23rd annual Farm and Tractor Day was in 2017. This event celebrates farm life.
 Rio Linda hosts an event known as the Rio Linda Elverta Country Faire; the 2nd annual country faire was in 2014.

Education
 Orchard Elementary
 Dry Creek Elementary School
 West Side Elementary
 Heritage Peak Charter School
 Rio Linda High School
 Rio Linda Preparatory Academy

Library
 Rio Linda library has computers, and a children's area offers toys, puppets, and a small puppet theatre for the children, donated by the active Friends group. Windows look out over a playground and softball field. Entrance to the large parking lot is from 6th Street. The first library in Rio Linda opened on September 26, 1916. The library also features a Seed Library for sharing seeds.

Notable people
 Ken Ackerman, KFBK and KCBS radio announcer, grew up at 22nd and E Streets in Rio Linda
 Sheila Hudson, Triple-Jump record holder
 Bob Oliver, Professional Baseball player
 Darren Oliver, Professional Baseball player
 Chuck Quackenbush, former California Insurance Commissioner, lived in Rio Linda while in office
 Justin E. H. Smith, philosopher and author, lived in Rio Linda from 1974 to 1987
 Norma Lee, western swing artist, was once an honorary mayor of Rio Linda.

References

External links

Census-designated places in Sacramento County, California
Census-designated places in California